Josef "Jos" Minsch (June 23, 1941 – June 7, 2008) was a Swiss alpine skier who competed in the 1964 Winter Olympics and the 1968 Winter Olympics. He was born and died in Klosters. In 1964 he finished fourth in the downhill contest and ninth in the giant slalom competition. Four years later he finished 14th in the downhill event.

References
Profile
Biography of Josef Minsch 

1941 births
2008 deaths
Swiss male alpine skiers
Olympic alpine skiers of Switzerland
Alpine skiers at the 1964 Winter Olympics
Alpine skiers at the 1968 Winter Olympics
20th-century Swiss people